Missinaibi Lake is a lake in Ontario, Canada, about  north of Chapleau.  It is the source of the Missinaibi River, which rises from the lake and flows northeastward into the Moose River.

Together with the Missinaibi River, Brunswick River, Brunswick Lake, Little Missinaibi River, and Little Missinaibi Lake, the shores and waters of the lake are part of the Missinaibi Provincial Park. The lake is also in the middle of the Chapleau Crown Game Preserve. There is a Hudson's Bay Company trading post located nearby.

The lake is named after the River of the same name,(masinâpôy sîpiy, ᒪᓯᓈᐴᔾ ᓰᐱᔾ) meaning "pictured waters" in the Cree language which is thought to refer to the pictographs found on rock faces along the river.

References

External links
Ontario Parks - Missinaibi Provincial Park official website

Lakes of Sudbury District
Pictographs in Canada